The 1911–12 Prima Categoria season was won by Pro Vercelli.

Pre-league qualifications
Played on September 24 and 27, 1911.

Casale was admitted to the 1a Categoria Italian Championship.

Main tournament

Classification

Results table

Veneto-Emilia test group

Classification

Results table

Final
Played on April 28 and May 5.

References and sources
Almanacco Illustrato del Calcio - La Storia 1898-2004, Panini Edizioni, Modena, September 2005

1911-12
1911–12 in European association football leagues